Rangel (
) is a surname of Portuguese origin.

Rangel is a toponymic surname. The origin of the term is uncertain but French And Germanic roots are discussed, one are from the German "ragin-walt" - a mighty ruler. 
Other theory about the origin of surname is the
Rang a commune in the Doubs department in the Bourgogne-Franche-Comté  region in eastern France.
Place where the estate would have been named after this place in Portugal with the addition of the suffix EL
The Surname came from the estate of “Ronge or Range”, later Rangel, located in Ribeira de Coselhas, Coimbra Portugal. It belonged to Gundisalvus and was taken from the Moors, during the siege of Coimbra in 1117 in the Christian reconquest of the Iberian peninsula. The surname is found in Portugal, Spain, Germany, France, England, United States, Brazil, Venezuela, Mexico, Russia, East Timor, and Angola.

In places like Mexico the surname is strictly linked to the Spanish branch of the surname during colonial ages, in other places are the original Portuguese branch. In Rhode Island, Massachusetts, Hawaii, New England in general and in The United Kingdom the surname is closely related to recent portuguese migrations.

Notable people with this name

Ana Maria Rangel, Brazilian politician; she was the Progressive Republican Party presidential candidate in 2006
Àngel Rangel, Spanish football player currently playing for Swansea City
 Beatrice Rangel, Venezuelan writer and politician
Carlos Rangel, Venezuelan writer, liberal, journalist and diplomat.
 Carlos Rangel Garbiras, Venezuelan physician and  politician
Charles B. Rangel, Democratic member of the USA House of Representatives since 1971
David Rangel, Mexican football (soccer) player
David Rangel Pastor, Spanish football player currently playing for CD Castellón
 Domingo Alberto Rangel, Venezuelan writer, journalist, founder of MIR leftist party
Esdras Rangel, Mexican football (soccer) goalkeeper
Eleazar Diaz Rangel, Venezuelan journalist, director of Ultimas Noticias newspaper
Francisco Rangel Gómez, Venezuelan militar, governor of Bolivar state
Godofredo Rangel, Brazilian writer
Gustavo Rangel Briceño, Venezuelan militar, ex Defense Minister
Henry Rangel Silva, Venezuelan militar, ex Defense Minister, governor of Trujillo state
Irma Rangel (Texas politician), (d. 2003), member of the Texas House of Representatives
José Vicente Rangel, a Venezuelan leftist politician
José Vicente Rangel Ávalos, vice minister of Interior, Justice and Peace of Venezuela
Juana Rangel de Cuellar, the founder of the Colombian city of Cúcuta
Julio César Rangel, Colombian road cyclist
Leonel Godoy Rangel, Mexican lawyer, politician and the current governor of Michoacán
Licinio Rangel (1936–2002), bishop of the Catholic Church in Campos, Brazil
Loren Ferré Rangel, trustee of the Conservation Trust of Puerto Rico
Rafael Rangel, Venezuelan microbiologist
Rafael Rangel Sostmann, president of Tecnológico de Monterrey in Mexico
Rubén Rangel (born 1977), Venezuelan road cyclist
Víctor Rangel Ayala, a Mexican footballer
Arturo Soto Rangel, Mexican film, television, and stage actor
Beatriz Paredes Rangel, Mexican politician affiliated to the Institutional Revolutionary Party

Portuguese-language surnames
Spanish-language surnames